Jim Donovan may refer to:

Jim Donovan (musician) (born 1968), member of the band Rusted Root
Jim Donovan (sportscaster) (born 1956), former NBC television sportscaster and sports director at WKYC-TV in Cleveland, Ohio
Jim Donovan (director) (born 1964), Canadian television and film director
Jim Donovan (banker), American banker

See also
James Donovan (disambiguation)